Bayram Malkan (born 20 February 1999) is a Turkish boxer in the light heavyweight (-81 kg) discipline. He received a quota for the 2020 Summer Olympics.

Bayram Malkan was born in Ağrı, Turkey on 20 February 1999.

He won the silver medal at the 2018 Mediterranean Games in Tarragona, Spain. He competed at the 2019 AIBA World Championships in Yekaterinburg, Russia, and the 2019 European Games in Minsk, Belarus. He obtained a quota for the 2020 Summer Olympics.

References

1994 births
Living people
Sportspeople from Ağrı
Turkish male boxers
Light-heavyweight boxers
Fenerbahçe boxers
Mediterranean Games competitors for Turkey
Mediterranean Games silver medalists for Turkey
European Games competitors for Turkey
Boxers at the 2019 European Games
Boxers at the 2020 Summer Olympics
Olympic boxers of Turkey
21st-century Turkish people